RKG-3 is a series of Soviet anti-tank hand grenades. It superseded the RPG-43, RPG-40 and RPG-6 series of grenades. It entered service in 1950, and was still being used by insurgents in Iraq and Afghanistan into the 2000s and 2010s, against the vehicles of NATO forces.

Design
RKG stands for Ruchnaya Kumulyativnaya Granata ("handheld  shaped-charge grenade"). The grenade has an odd strap-like lever (or "spoon") that covers the base of the handle and runs up each side of the handle. When the pin is pulled, the "spoon" falls away, and when the grenade is thrown a spring deploys a four-panelled drogue parachute. This parachute stabilizes the grenade in flight and ensures that the grenade strikes the target at a 90 degree angle, maximising the effect of the shaped charge. Realistic accurate throw ranges are within . The lethality radius is within  due to concussion and fragmentation. The casualty radius is within  and the danger space from fragmentation is within .

The fuze in the handle activates the grenade. When the parachute deploys, its ejection throws a weight to the rear of the handle and disables the safety. When it impacts or stops, inertia causes the weight to fly forward and hit the spring-loaded firing pin, which activates the primer detonator in the base. This sets off the booster charge in the base of the shaped charge, detonating and enhancing the main charge. The sensitive fuze guarantees that the grenade will detonate if it impacts any target.

Armour penetration depends on the model. The original RKG-3 used a basic shaped charge with a steel liner and could penetrate  against Rolled Homogeneous Armor (RHA). The RKG-3M used a copper-lined shaped-charge warhead and had a penetration of 165 mm; the RKG-3T had an improved copper liner that had a penetration of 170 mm.

History
The RKG-3 was adopted into service in 1950. A few years later it was replaced by the improved RKG-3M and enhanced RKG-3T. Thicker top armor caused the Soviets to develop the larger RKG-3EM. In early 1970s the Soviet Army replaced this grenade with the RPG-18, but many other countries and guerrilla movements are still using the RKG-3 in their armed forces. It was used extensively during the 1973 Yom Kippur War.

Ulrike Meinhof was injured by an RKG-3 while training with the PLO in a Syrian training camp.

RKG-3 grenades were widely used by Iraqi insurgents against American Humvees, Strykers and MRAPs.

The grenade has also been seen in use by the Aerorozvidka unit of the Ukrainian military in the 2022 Russian Invasion of Ukraine. PJSC Mayak modifies the grenade into the RKG 1600 by changing the fuze timing and adding 3D printed fins to stabilise its flight when dropped from a commercial drone. Alleged footage of these being used by Ukrainian forces against Russian forces has been published officially. The estimated total cost is "less than $100".

Models
RKG-3 Penetration : 125 mm RHA. Gross Weight: 1.07 kg. (2.35 lbs.)
RKG-3M (-Modernizirovannaya, "Improved") Model with liner changed from steel to copper. Penetration : 165 mm RHA. Gross Weight: 1.1 kg. (2.42 lbs.) Copies manufactured by East Germany (RKG-3Cu). 
RKG-3T Model with improved copper liner. Penetration: 170 mm RHA
RKG-3EM Model with larger warhead. Penetration: 220 mm RHA Gross Weight: 1.7 kg. (3.74 lbs.)

RKG-1600 Ukrainian adaptation with 3D printed stabilisation fins and modified fuzing for dropping from commercial drones.
UPG-8 (Uechebnaya Protivotankovaya Granata, "Training Anti-Tank Grenade"). Black body with white markings. The reusable warhead contains a reloadable black powder charge that mostly produces black smoke that is vented through holes in the heavy-gauge sheet-metal. A new fuze and parachute can be quickly reloaded in the handle after use by using special armorer tools.
M79 Copy of the RKG-3EM by Yugoimport SDPR. Copies are now manufactured by Serbia (M79) and Bosnia-Herzegovina (RKB-M79). Filling: 400g (0.88 lbs.) Hexolite, Penetration: 220 mm RHA, Gross Weight: 1.1 kg. (2.42 lbs.).
Type F-3 Chinese licensed production of the original Soviet RKG-3 with improvements. Penetration: 130 to 170 mm RHA Gross Weight: 1.07 kg. (2.35  lbs.)

See also
 List of Russian weaponry

References

Notes

Bibliography

External links
 https://www.rferl.org/a/ukraine-cheap-grenades-expensive-tanks/31835434.html

Anti-tank grenades
Hand grenades of the Soviet Union
Cold War weapons of the Soviet Union